The BMW Gran Turismo model range may refer to:
 BMW 3 Series Gran Turismo
 BMW 5 Series Gran Turismo
 BMW 6 Series Gran Turismo

Gallery

Gran Turismo